The Italy national rowing team represents Italy in International rowing competitions such as Olympic Games, World Rowing Championships or European Rowing Championships.

History
The Italian national rowing team has participated in all of the Summer Olympics since Paris 1900.

Olympic Games

World Rowing Championships
The first women's medal at the world championships was won by Elisabetta Sancassani and Gabriella Bascelli at the 2002 World Rowing Championships.

European Rowing Championships
Italy ranks 2nd in the all-time medal table of the European championships behind East Germany.

All medals

Multiple medalists

Olympic Games

World Championships

See also
 Italian Rowing Federation (Italian: Federazione Italiana Canottaggio, FIC)
 Italy at the Olympics
 Rowing Olympics All-time medal table
 World Championships All-time medal table
 European Championships medal table (2007-2019)

References

External links
 Annuario 2013  (all results update to 2013)
 Breve storia del canottaggio  (all results update to 2009)
 Italian Rowing Federation website

rowing